Andris Bērziņš may refer to:
 Andris Bērziņš (Latvian President) (born 1944), former President of Latvia (2011–2015)
 Andris Bērziņš (Latvian Prime Minister) (born 1951), former Prime Minister of Latvia (2000–02)